The Ghazni Minarets are two elaborately decorated minaret towers located in Ghazni city, central Afghanistan. They were built in middle of the twelfth century and are the only surviving elements of the mosque of Bahram Shah. The two minarets are 600 meters (1968 feet) apart and lie in an open plain, north-east of Ghazni city.

The minarets had a height of 44 meters in the 19th century, before the top half of both minarets crumbled in an earthquake in 1902. Now the minarets are about 20 meters high. Both minarets of Ghazni are 20 metres (66 feet) tall and built of fired mud brick. The surface of the towers are decorated beautifully with intricate geometric patterns and Qurunic verses on elaborate terracotta tiles. In the 1960s, both towers were fitted with sheet metal roofs in a limited preservation effort.

The ruins of the Palace of Sultan Mas'ud III are located near Mas'ud III's minaret.

History
The 12th century minarets are the most famous monuments of Ghazni city and are among the last surviving remnants of the great Ghaznavid Empire. The two minarets are called, Mas'ud III Minaret (Manar-i Mas'ud III) and Bahram Shah Minaret (Manar-i Bahram Shah) after the ruler who built them, Mas'ud III (A.D. 1099-1115) and Bahram Shah (A.D. 1118-1157). The excavated palace of Mas'ud III lies nearby to the towers.

The minarets were taller before the upper sections were damaged and destroyed over time. Part of the Masud III minaret top was destroyed in an earthquake in 1902.

Threats
Ghazni Minarets are not well preserved or protected. Both towers are in danger from natural elements and the political instability in Afghanistan. There are no basic security measures in place to prevent vandalism and the towers are in need of new roofing to prevent water infiltration into the towers.

The towers' facade contains intricate geometric patterns and Quranic inscriptions which are deteriorating rapidly with exposure to rain and snow. They are further affected by the nearby road and the area is subject to periodic flooding.

Gallery

Mas'ud III Minaret 
Mas'ud III's minaret is stylistically more complex, and uses a larger variety of decorative techniques, compared to the minaret of his son Bahram Shah.

Bahram Shah Minaret 

Bahram Shah's minaret was inspired by the minaret of his father, and built a few decades later (he ruled between 1117 to 1152), but is stylistically simpler.

See also
 Minaret of Jam
 List of oldest minarets
 Citadel of Ghazni

References 

Buildings and structures in Ghazni Province
Minarets in Afghanistan
Islamic architecture
Mosque architecture
Historic preservation
World Heritage Sites in Danger